Valley-Hi is a borough in Fulton County, Pennsylvania, United States. The population was 7 at the 2020 census.

Geography
Valley-Hi is located in northwestern Fulton County at  (40.026222, -78.196071).

Demographics

2010 census
At the 2010 census, there were 15 people, 6 households, and 5 families residing within the borough. The population density was 30.0 people per square mile (11.5/km2). There were 30 housing units at an average density of 60.0 per square mile (23.1/km2). The racial makeup of the borough was 100% White.

There were 6 households, 2 had children under the age of 18 living with them, 83.3% were headed by married couples living together, and 16.7% were non-families. 16.7% of households were made up of individuals, and none had someone living alone who was 65 or older. The average household size was 2.50, and the average family size was 2.80.

The age distribution was 26.7% under age 18, 0% from 18 to 24, 46.6% from 25 to 44, 6.7% from 45 to 64, and 20.0% 65 or older. The median age was 38.5 years. For every 100 females there were 114.3 males. For every 100 females age 18 and over, there were 83.3 males.

2000 census
At the 2000 census there were 20 people, 7 households, and 4 families in the borough. The population density was 39.7 people per square mile (15.4/km2). There were 29 housing units at an average density of 57.5 per square mile (22.4/km2).  The racial makeup of the borough was 100.00% White.
There were 7 households, out of which none had children under the age of 18 living with them, 71.4% were married couples living together, and 28.6% were non-families. 28.6% of households were made up of individuals, and none had someone living alone who was 65 or older. The average household size was 2.86 and the average family size was 3.40.

The age distribution was 10.0% from 18 to 24, 30.0% from 25 to 44, 50.0% from 45 to 64, and 10.0% 65 or older. The median age was 56 years. For every 100 females there were 66.7 males. For every 100 females age 18 and over, there were 66.7 males.

The median household income was $28,750 and the median family income  was $16,250. Males had a median income of $0 versus $19,583 for females. The per capita income for the borough was $17,677. There are 33.3% of families living below the poverty line and 15.4% of the population, including no under eighteens and none of those over 64.

References

Boroughs in Fulton County, Pennsylvania